Allan Hird may refer to:

Allan Hird, Sr. (1918–2007), Australian rules footballer, grandfather of James Hird
Allan Hird, Jr. (born 1946), Australian rules footballer, father of James Hird